Women's wushu was contested at the 2009 Asian Indoor Games in Hanoi, Vietnam from November 4 to November 7. The competition took place at Trịnh Hoài Đức Gymnasium.

Medalists

Duilian

Sanda

Medal table

Results

Duilian

Barehand
7 November

Weapons
7 November

Sanda

48 kg

52 kg
4–6 November

56 kg

60 kg
4–6 November

65 kg

70 kg
4–6 November

References
 Official site

2009 Asian Indoor Games events
2009 Asian Indoor Games
2009 in wushu (sport)